Brahmapur may refer to the following places:

 Brahmapur, Bihar 
 Brahmapur, Nepal
 Brahmapur, Odisha
 Brahmapur railway station
 Brahmapur, West Bengal

See also
 Brahampur, Phagwara, Punjab